Slipper lobsters are a family (Scyllaridae) of about 90 species of achelate crustaceans, in the Decapoda clade Reptantia, found in all warm oceans and seas. They are not true lobsters, but are more closely related to spiny lobsters and furry lobsters. Slipper lobsters are instantly recognisable by their enlarged antennae, which project forward from the head as wide plates. All the species of slipper lobsters are edible, and some, such as the Moreton Bay bug and the Balmain bug (Ibacus peronii) are of commercial importance.

Description
Slipper lobsters have six segments in their heads and eight segments in the thorax, which are collectively covered in a thick carapace. The six segments of the abdomen each bear a pair of pleopods, while the thoracic appendages are either walking legs or maxillipeds. The head segments bear various mouthparts and two pairs of antennae. The first antennae, or antennules, are held on a long flexible stalk, and are used for sensing the environment. The second antennae are the slipper lobsters' most conspicuous feature, as they are expanded and flattened into large plates that extend horizontally forward from the animal's head.

There is considerable variation in size among species of slipper lobsters.

Ecology
Slipper lobsters eat a variety of molluscs, including limpets, mussels and oysters, as well as crustaceans, polychaetes and echinoderms. They grow slowly and live to a considerable age. They lack the giant neurones which allow other decapod crustaceans to perform tailflips, and must rely on other means to escape predator attack, such as burial in a substrate and reliance on the heavily armoured exoskeleton.

The most significant predators of slipper lobsters are bony fish, with the grey triggerfish being the most significant predator of Scyllarides latus in the Mediterranean Sea.

Life cycle
After hatching out of their eggs, young slipper lobsters pass through around ten instars as phyllosoma larvae — leaf-like, planktonic zoeae. These ten or so stages last the greater part of a year, after which the larva moults into a "nisto" stage that lasts a few weeks. Almost nothing is known about the transition from this stage to the adults, which continue to grow through a series of moults.

Commercial importance

Although they are fished for wherever they are found, slipper lobsters have not been the subject of such intense fishery as spiny lobsters or true lobsters. The methods used for catching slipper lobsters varies depending on the species' ecology. Those that prefer soft substrates, such as Thenus and Ibacus, are often caught by trawling, while those that prefer crevices, caves and reefs (including Scyllarides, Arctides and Parribacus species) are usually caught by scuba divers.

The global catch of slipper lobsters was reported in 1991 to be .

Common names
A number of common names have been applied to the family Scyllaridae. The most common of these is "slipper lobster", followed by "shovel-nosed lobster" and "locust lobster". "Spanish lobster" is used for members of the genus Arctides, "mitten lobster" for Parribacus, and "fan lobster" for Evibacus and Ibacus. In Australia, a number of species are called "bugs" (for example, the Balmain bug and Moreton Bay bug), especially those in the genus Ibacus. Other names used in Australia include "bay lobster", "blind lobster", "flapjack", "flat lobster", "flying saucer", "gulf lobster", "mudbug", "sandbug", "shovel-nose bug", "shovelnose lobster", "crayfish", "slipper bug" and "squagga". Rarer terms include "flathead lobster" (for Thenus orientalis) and "bulldozer lobster".
In Greece they may be known as Kolochtypes which roughly translates as 'bum hitter'. Twenty-two genera are recognised, the majority of which were erected in 2002 by Lipke Holthuis for species formerly classified under Scyllarus:

Genera
Slipper lobsters belong to the following genera.

Scyllarinae Latreille, 1825
Acantharctus Holthuis, 2002
Antarctus Holthuis, 2002
Antipodarctus Holthuis, 2002
Bathyarctus Holthuis, 2002
Biarctus Holthuis, 2002
Chelarctus Holthuis, 2002
Crenarctus Holthuis, 2002
Eduarctus Holthuis, 2002
Galearctus Holthuis, 2002
Gibbularctus Holthuis, 2002
Petrarctus Holthuis, 2002
Remiarctus Holthuis, 2002
Scammarctus Holthuis, 2002
Scyllarella Rathbun, 1935 (extinct)
Scyllarus Fabricius, 1775

Arctidinae Holthuis, 1985
Arctides Holthuis, 1960
Scyllarides Gill, 1898

Ibacinae Holthuis, 1985
Evibacus S. I. Smith, 1869
Ibacus Leach, 1815
Parribacus Dana, 1852

Theninae Holthuis, 1985
Thenus Leach, 1815

incertae sedis
Palibacus Förster, 1984 (extinct)

Gallery
Gallery of various slipper lobsters species:

Fossil record
The fossil record of slipper lobsters extends back 100–120 million years, which is considerably less than that of slipper lobsters' closest relatives, the spiny lobsters. One significant earlier fossil is Cancrinos claviger, which was described from Upper Jurassic sediments at least , and may represent either an ancestor of modern slipper lobsters, or the sister group to the family Scyllaridae sensu stricto.

References

Further reading

External links

Achelata
Edible crustaceans
Commercial crustaceans
Extant Early Cretaceous first appearances